The Accursed is an epithet applied to:

People
 John II of Salerno (died between 994 and 998), count of the palace of Salerno and acting regent for Prince Pandulf II
 Sviatopolk I of Kiev (c. 980–1019), Prince of Turov and Grand Prince of Kiev
 Toghrul of Ghazna (died 1053), Turkish slave general and usurper

Fictional characters
Malekith the Accursed, a villain in the Marvel Comics universe
Uldor the Accursed, an Easterling who betrayed Maedhros in J. R. R. Tolkien's Middle-earth

See also
 Conomor the Cursed, sixth century ruler of Brittany
 Alexander the Great, called "gojastak" (accursed) in Zoroastrian literature

Lists of people by epithet